Apple Penne is a 2013 Tamil-language romantic drama film directed by R. K. Kalaimani. The film stars Vatsan and Aishwarya Menon, while Roja plays a pivotal role.

Cast 
Vatsan as James
Aishwarya Menon as Komalavalli 
Roja as Hamsavalli
Thambi Ramaiah as Constable Arumugam
Suresh
Deva
Suchitra
KG Pandian

Production 
Vatsan was roped in to play the lead role in the film for the first time in his career after producer K. G. Pandian noticed him for his roles in his previous films. The film is a woman-centric film and Roja was roped in to play a pivotal role.

Soundtrack 
The film features seven songs composed by Mani Sharma. Kalaipuli Thanu released the audio in September 2013. The soundtrack was released under the label Saregama.

Release 
The Times of India gave the film one-and-a-half stars and wrote that "There is a dated feel to almost everything in Apple Penne, right from the plot to the filmmaking".

References 

2010s Tamil-language films
Indian romantic drama films
Films scored by Mani Sharma
2013 drama films
2013 films
Films directed by R. K. Kalaimani